PALOP or Palop may refer to:

 PALOP, the group of Portuguese-speaking African countries
 Andrés Palop, a Spanish footballer